The Wellington City Archives preserves records of the Wellington City Council and other organisations relating to the history of Wellington, New Zealand. Established in 1994, the Council archives were housed in a single purpose-built facility in 1995, opened to the public in 1996, and made available online since 2007.

The archives are open to the public and receive up to 1000 information requests a month, from Wellington City Council staff and the general public. About half of the requests are building consent searches, and up to 300 are assisting council staff preparing Land Information Memorandums (LIM). The remainder range from historical and genealogical research requests to enquiries about land history or property information.

History

Wellington was the first site of local government in New Zealand, and the city's archives date back to 1842 when the Wellington Borough Council was established. As recently as 1994, council records were stored at more than 10 places around Wellington, loosely classified using a system devised in 1926. Many were housed in sub-standard conditions, at risk from temperature extremes and leaks, in breach of the Local Government Act requirements for the preservation of government archives. Some were stored below sea level in the Town Hall basement, and periodically soaked in seawater. The "rotting" documents were at risk of being lost forever, so the City Council approved relocating them to a central facility at a cost of $300,000.

The Wellington City Archives were formally established in 1994, and Michelle Redward was appointed in March as Council archivist to supervise the move. The new Wellington City Archives was opened by Mayor Mark Blumsky on 26 June 1996, in an environmentally-controlled and earthquake-proof facility off Tory Street, with 5 km of shelving over 730 square metres of storage area. The Archives were expanded in 2005 to 1000 square metres, creating a work room and meeting room. In 2007, more than 370,000 collection items and 9,000 scanned images were made available online, including large numbers of digitised building permit and consent records.

In 2016 the Archives partnered with information management company Techtonics to develop a new information repository, a project that won the 2017 ALGIM Information and Records Management Project of the Year award. Wellington City Archives is partnering with startup Excio to make more photographs from the collection available directly to people's mobile devices.

List of Wellington City Archives managers 

 Michelle Redward (1994–1998)
Joanna Newman (1998–2008)
 Adrian Humphris (2012–)

Holdings

Wellington City Archives, one of the largest territorial archives in New Zealand, contains 1.4 million documents, including over 20,000 photographs, which would stretch 10 km if laid back-to-back. The archive's collections include:

 A parchment electoral roll dating for the first council in 1842, listing all men eligible to vote
An 1842 letter from settler Chauncey Henry Townsend, the Archives' earliest correspondence
A number of early sketches by Charles Decimus Barraud
 Drainage and storm water plans recording the former location of streams
Minutes of the town board and City Council starting in 1863
Transcribed rate books containing land ownership records beginning in 1863
 Correspondence from Richard Seddon and Julius Vogel
The Wellington Harbour Board archives, from its founding in 1880
The hand-drawn maps of Thomas Ward, who spent three years in the 1880s walking around Wellington sketching street plans
 Building permits from 1892 and all completed contemporary resource and building consents (only live consents are held at the City Council offices)
 The records of the Union Steam Ship Company from 1900
 Panoramic photos of 1920s Wellington by photographer Robert Percy Moore
Photos from the official Council Photographer from the 1950s onward

Gallery

References

External links

 Wellington City Archives website

Archives in New Zealand
History of New Zealand
City archives
1994 establishments in New Zealand